Bo Lennart Georg Siegbahn (1915–2008) was a Swedish diplomat and politician.

Bo Siegbahn was born in Lund on 25 February 1915, as the older of two sons of the physicist Manne Siegbahn and his wife, Karin (née Högbom). He grew up in Lund and in Uppsala from 1922, when his father was appointed to a professorship there. Manne Siegbahn received the Nobel Prize in Physics in 1924, and Bo Siegbahn's younger brother Kai Siegbahn was awarded the same prize in 1981.

Siegbahn took B.A. and LL.B. degrees at Uppsala University and entered a career in the Swedish Foreign Office during the years of World War II, serving as a junior diplomat at the Swedish embassies in both Vichy and Washington, D.C. During the 1960s he served as Swedish ambassador in Morocco, also Senegal, and Israel. Politically active as a Social Democrat, he was a member of the First Chamber of the Swedish parliament 1957–1961, but later switched political allegiances and returned to the (now unicameral) Riksdag as a member representing the liberal-conservative (centre-right) Moderate Party 1974–1982.

Siegbahn was one of several people to be suspected as the author of a series of political satirical novels published under the pseudonym Bo Baldersson.

Bo Siegbahn's wife, Colette, died on 2 December 2007. He died a few weeks later, on 7 January 2008.

Sources
Birgitta Stanghed & Thorulf Arwidson, "Bo Siegbahn" (obituary), Svenska Dagbladet 5 February 2008.

1915 births
2008 deaths
Uppsala University alumni
Members of the Riksdag from the Social Democrats
Moderate Party politicians
Ambassadors of Sweden to Morocco
Ambassadors of Sweden to Senegal
Ambassadors of Sweden to Israel
Members of the Första kammaren